Frederico Carlos Soares Campos (11 April 1927 – 1 March 2021) was a Brazilian politician. He twice served as Mayor of his hometown, Cuiabá. He also served as the 45th Governor of Mato Grosso.

Biography
Campos was the nephew of General Dilermando Gomes Monteiro. He was appointed Mayor of Cuiabá by Mato Grosso governor Pedro Pedrossian, serving from 1966 to 1969. He worked in the government of Governor  from 1975 to 1978. That year, President Ernesto Geisel appointed him Governor of Mato Grosso, the 45th person to hold the position.

In 1988, Campos won his first election to become Mayor of Cuiabá as a member of the Liberal Front Party, having held the seat 20 years earlier. In 2006, he ran unsuccessfully as a member of the Brazilian Labour Party to the Legislative Assembly of Mato Grosso.

Frederico Campos died from COVID-19 during the COVID-19 pandemic in Brazil in Cuiabá on 1 March 2021 at the age of 93.

References

1927 births
2021 deaths
People from Cuiabá
Governors of Mato Grosso
Democrats (Brazil) politicians
Brazilian Labour Party (current) politicians
Deaths from the COVID-19 pandemic in Mato Grosso